Danuta Kobylińska-Walas (also Danuta Walas-Kobylińska, born 27 November 1931 in Kozietuły, Poland) was the first female sea captain. She is the first woman to successfully train for the profession of sailor and reach the position of Sea Captain. She studied at the Maritime University of Szczecin. Kobylińska-Walas was a nautical captain from 1962 and led among others MS Kopalnia Wujek, Kołobrzeg II, MS Toruń, MS Bieszczady, MS Powstaniec Wielkopolski, MS Budowlany, MS Uniwersytet Toruński, MS Jarosław, and MS Malbork. She is now retired and lives in Warsaw and Szczecin.

Orders 
  Polonia Restituta Knight's Cross
  Medal of the 40th Anniversary of People's Poland

References

External links 
 Danuta Kobylińska-Walas on www.kobiety.pl (pl)

1931 births
Living people
People from Szczecin
Sea captains
Polish sailors
20th-century Polish women